The 2015 Nigerian Senate election in Ebonyi State was held on March 28, 2015, to elect members of the Nigerian Senate to represent Ebonyi State. Sam Egwu representing Ebonyi North, Joseph Ogba representing Ebonyi Central and Sonni Ogbuoji representing Ebonyi South all won on the platform of Peoples Democratic Party.

Overview

Summary

Results

Ebonyi North 
Peoples Democratic Party candidate Sam Egwu won the election, defeating All Progressives Congress candidate Pius Ekuma and other party candidates.

Ebonyi Central 
Peoples Democratic Party candidate Joseph Ogba won the election, defeating All Progressives Congress candidate Anyigor Nwanchor and other party candidates.

Ebonyi South 
Peoples Democratic Party candidate Sonni Ogbuoji won the election, defeating All Progressives Congress candidate John Arinze and other party candidates.

References 

Ebonyi State Senate elections
March 2015 events in Nigeria
Ebo